Rhythmatic Eternal King Supreme is the fifth studio album by rapper Reks. the album was released on March 8, 2011, under ShowOff and Brick Records. The album received favorable reviews from most music critics. The album was nominated for Hip-Hop Album of the Year for the Boston Music Awards and the UMA. It features production from producers including The Alchemist, DJ Premier, Pete Rock, Nottz and Hi-Tek.

Track listing

Charts

References 

Reks albums
2011 albums
Albums produced by Statik Selektah
Albums produced by DJ Premier
Albums produced by Sha Money XL
Albums produced by Pete Rock
Albums produced by Hi-Tek
Albums produced by the Alchemist (musician)
Albums produced by Nottz